St Mary and St John's Church and variants of it are the names of several churches dedicated to St Mary and St John the Evangelist; these include:

St Mary and St John's Church, Hardraw
St Mary and St John Church, Hinxton
Church of St Mary and St John, Lamyat
St Mary and St John Church, Wolverhampton